Robert Lorenz (born April 1, 1965) is an American film producer and director, best known for his collaborations with Clint Eastwood. He has been nominated for the Academy Award for Best Picture three times, for Mystic River (2003), Letters from Iwo Jima (2006), and American Sniper (2014). He has also directed Trouble with the Curve (2012) and The Marksman (2021).

Life 
Lorenz was born in Chicago in 1965 and has lived in Los Angeles since 1989. As a producer he has been nominated three times for Best Picture: Mystic River (2003), Letters from Iwo Jima (2006), and American Sniper (2014). In 2012 he made his directorial debut with Trouble with the Curve. He is a longtime member of the Directors Guild of America and the Producers Guild of America. In 2015, he had a first look deal with Warner Bros.

Filmography
He was producer for all films unless otherwise noted.

Film

Second unit director or assistant director

As director

As writer

Art department

Miscellaneous crew

Television

Second unit director or assistant director

References

External links
 

American film producers
American film directors
Living people
1965 births